Martin Kok (25 June 1967 – 8 December 2016) was a Dutch criminal turned blogger.

Early life
He grew up in Volendam and as a teenager sold eels along with his father and brother, dressed in traditional Volendammer garb of red shirt, baggy black pants, and clogs. He didn't enjoy it, but started selling eels in bars frequented by criminals and then moved into cocaine dealing. He was nicknamed "the Stutterer".

Criminal career
In 1988 he shot at and missed a former schoolmate who had cut into his business. Several months later he fought with a rival, hitting him with a barstool. The rival died of his injuries the following day and Kok was sentenced to five years in prison. During this imprisonment he befriended Willem Holleeder, who was in prison for the kidnapping of Freddy Heineken. He also befriended Cor van Hout, an accomplice of Holleeder in the kidnapping.

On release from prison he murdered the boyfriend of a former partner. He also expanded his business into prostitution.

Blogging
He started a crime blog called "Vlinderscrime" (vlinder being the Dutch word for "butterfly") in February 2015. He had many contacts in the criminal world, both in and outside of jail. He reported on criminals from many backgrounds, often giving full names, instead of the Dutch media tradition of given name and initial. 

He enjoyed his newfound fame and would often taunt other criminals. He was sponsored by and ran adverts for MPC, a company that provided encrypted phones to criminals.

Assassination attempts
Someone tried to shoot him while he was at home in 2015 but failed, leaving bullet holes in his car.  In 2016 an explosive device was found under his car.

Murder
On 8 December 2016 he was walking with another man in Amsterdam when CCTV showed someone running up behind him outside the Citizen M hotel and pointing a gun at him. It is not clear if the gun jammed or if the shooter lost nerve. The target seemed to be unaware of the attempt on his life. Later that evening, outside a sex club in Laren, a second attempt was made, which succeeded. 

He was buried in Vredenhof Cemetery.

Aftermath
The murder was linked to a Scottish criminal organisation by Scottish police who had investigated them via Operation Escalade.

A European Arrest Warrant was issued for Christopher Hughes in relation to the murder. He was faced with charges of concealing money and supplying encrypted devices to others (including Kok), a second charge relating to the supply of cocaine and a final charge in relation to the murder of Kok. In April 2022 Hughes was convicted at the High Court in Stirling, Scotland and jailed for at least 25 years.

See also
Marengo trial

References

1967 births
2016 deaths
Dutch murderers
Dutch drug traffickers
Dutch bloggers
Prisoners and detainees of the Netherlands
Dutch prisoners and detainees
Dutch murder victims
Dutch gangsters
Murdered gangsters
Assassinated Dutch people
Deaths by firearm in the Netherlands
People murdered in the Netherlands
People murdered by British organized crime